The Barolo shearwater (Puffinus baroli), also known as the North Atlantic little shearwater or Macaronesian shearwater, is a small shearwater which breeds in the Azores and Canaries of Macaronesia in the North Atlantic Ocean.  The English name and the specific baroli refers to Carlo Tencredi Falletti, marquis of Barolo.

Taxonomy
Barolo shearwater was formally described in 1857 by the French naturalist Charles Lucien Bonaparte under the binomial name Procellaria baroli. The specific epithet commemorates Carlo Tencredi Falletti, marquis of Barolo. This shearwater is now placed in the genus Puffinus that was introduced by the French zoologist Mathurin Jacques Brisson in 1760 with the Manx shearwater (Puffinus puffinus) as the type species. The species in monotypic: no subspecies are recognised.

It was previously considered conspecific with the little shearwater (Puffinus assimilis) of the southern hemisphere. Mitochondrial DNA cytochrome b sequence analysis indicated that baroli and boydi were very close to the nominate subspecies of Audubon's shearwater. BirdLife International retain the forms baroli and boydi within little shearwater. The British Ornithologists' Union  accepted P. baroli as a distinct species in 2005, as has Clements Checklist.  The American Ornithologists' Union followed in 2013.

Description
Features that distinguish the Barolo shearwater from the Manx shearwater and other North Atlantic Puffinus species include the pale face, silvery panel in the upperwings, shorter more rounded wings, and blue feet. As well as the pale face with the darkly contrasting eye.

Distribution
The Barolo shearwater breeds on the Azores, Desertas, Savage and Canary islands. The largest colony, of 1400 pairs, occurs on the Selvagen Islands. The non-breeding range is the tropical and sub-tropic northeast Atlantic.

Behaviour
The Barolo shearwater feeds in the upper 15m of the water column, which is similar to the closely related Audubon's shearwater Puffinus lherminieri of the western Atlantic and Caribbean Sea. Barolo shearwaters do not have a preferred time of day to forage or rest and they may hunt for food during either day or night, although they seem to be more ready to fly in the daylight hours. They feed mainly on fish and cephalopods, with Argonauta argo being the most common cephalopod taken in the Azores but also being part of a diverse selection of cephalopod prey, while the fish taken were almost exclusively Phycis spp.

Threats
Like other Procellariforms, introduced predators (rats and cats) must be their main threats at breeding colonies. In addition, fledglings are attracted to artificial lights at night during their maiden flights from nests to the sea. On Tenerife, Canary Islands, a decline on the number of birds attracted to lights have been reported, suggesting a population decline on the island.

References

External links
 BTO BirdFacts - Macaronesian shearwater
 Madeira Birds: Macaronesian shearwater
 Recordings of Barolo shearwater at Xeno-Canto

Barolo shearwater
Birds of Macaronesia
Barolo shearwater
Barolo shearwater